Anne Fuller (died 1790) was an Irish novelist in the Gothic genre. She was one of the earliest women writers of Gothic fiction.

Life and work
Anne Fuller was the daughter of William Fuller and Jane Harnett of West Kerries, Tralee, Co Kerry. Very little is known about her life except that she never married. She wrote three novels in the gothic style which were reprinted several times. She died of consumption in 1790 near Cork.

Since women readers of novels with supernatural characters and situations were considered "liable to many errors, both in conduct and conversation" and writers were even more confined, writers like Fuller often published anonymously. Fuller reportedly published her work Alan Fitz-Osbourne anonymously.

She was one of the "lost" women writers listed by Dale Spender in Mothers of the Novel: 100 Good Women Writers Before Jane Austen. Her work has since been reviewed as an insight into the early novelists and women writing in the 18th and 19th centuries. She is sometimes considered one of the key Irish authors in the development of gothic fiction along with Regina Maria Roche, Anne Burke, Mrs F. C. Patrick, Anna Millikin, Catharine Selden, Marianne Kenley, and Sydney Owenson (later Lady Morgan). Her writing itself, in contrast, Baker in 1924 described as 'mediocre'.

Bibliography 

 The Convent; or, The History of Sophia Nelson, Anne Fuller, London: T. Wilkins, 1786
 Alan Fitz-Osborne, an Historical Tale. 2 vols. Anne Fuller, Dublin: P. Byrne, 1787.
 The Son of Ethelwolf: An Historical Tale. 2 vols. Anne Fuller, London: G. G. J. and J. Robinson, 1789.

Further reading

 Dublin Chronicle 25 Sept 1790
 Gentleman's Magazine July 1790

References

External links 

The Formation of a Genre, Anne H. Stevens :British Historical Fiction before Scott, Part of the series Palgrave Studies in the Enlightenment, Romanticism and Cultures of Print pp 1-20
 THE SEARCH FOR THE ANGLO-SAXON ORAL POET ROBERTA FRANK DEPARTMENT OF ENGLISH AND CENTRE FOR MEDIEVAL STUDIES UNIVERSITY OF TORONTO
Forgotten fiction: reconsidering the Gothic Novel in eighteenth-century Ireland
Austin and the gothic writers like Fuller
 Loving and Sly Parodies: the gothic and anti-gothic: Atwood’s Lady Oracle & Fuller’s The Convent

1790 deaths
18th-century Irish women writers
18th-century Irish writers
Women romantic fiction writers
Irish romantic fiction writers
Irish novelists
Irish women novelists
Women horror writers
Irish horror writers
Writers of Gothic fiction